John Masara (born 16 August 1991) is a Zimbabwean cricketer. He made his first-class debut for Mountaineers in the 2017–18 Logan Cup on 6 November 2017. In December 2020, he was selected to play for the Mountaineers in the 2020–21 Logan Cup. He made his List A debut on 18 April 2021, for Mountaineers, in the 2020–21 Pro50 Championship. In July 2022, he was named in Zimbabwe's T20I squad, for their series against Bangladesh. He made his T20I debut on 2 August 2022, for Zimbabwe against Bangladesh.

References

External links
 

1991 births
Living people
Zimbabwean cricketers
Zimbabwe Twenty20 International cricketers
Place of birth missing (living people)
Mountaineers cricketers